Club de Deportes Concón National is a Chilean amateur football club based in Concón, Valparaíso Region. They currently play at the fifth level of Chilean football, Tercera B of Chile.

The club were founded on May 8, 1914 and participated for 14 years in Tercera División A and 10 seasons in Tercera División B.

Seasons played
16 seasons in Tercera División A
11 seasons in Tercera División B

Titles
Cuarta División de Chile: 1 (2001)

See also
Chilean football league system

References

Concón National
Football clubs in Chile
Association football clubs established in 1914
1914 establishments in Chile